Aberoer or Aber-oer is a scattered settlement in Wrexham County Borough, Wales; prior to 1974 it was in Denbighshire. It is part of the community area of Esclusham, and is situated on the rural slopes of Esclusham Mountain above Rhostyllen. The placename can be translated from the Welsh language as "[the] cold stream".

There was once a small colliery at Aberoer, working some of the lowest coals in the Middle Coal Measures, though few records remain of it.

References

Villages in Wrexham County Borough